Anthene kamilila is a butterfly in the family Lycaenidae. It is found in the Democratic Republic of the Congo, Uganda, western Kenya and Tanzania (the Kigoma district and the north-western part of the country). The habitat consists of forests.

Adult males mud-puddle.

References

Butterflies described in 1910
Anthene